The Pennsylvania State Game Lands Number 38 are Pennsylvania State Game Lands in Monroe County in Pennsylvania in the United States providing hunting, bird watching, and other activities.

Geography
State Game Lands Number 38 is located in Chestnuthill, Jackson, Pocono and Tunkhannock Townships in Monroe County. The Game Lands shares border with Big Pocono State Park to the east. The Pohopco Mountains lie to the southwest. Other nearby recreational and protected areas include Pennsylvania State Game Lands Number 127 to the north, Pennsylvania State Game Lands Number 221 to the northeast, Pennsylvania State Game Lands Number 186 to the southeast, Pennsylvania State Game Lands Number 129 to the west and Pennsylvania State Game Lands Number 318 to the northwest.

Statistics

References

036
Protected areas of Monroe County, Pennsylvania